Summer Isles may refer to:

 The Summer Isles, a small archipelago in Scotland
The Summer Isles, a novella by Ian R. MacLeod, later expanded into a novel. Both forms won the Sidewise Award.
The Summer Isles, a region of the Known World in George R.R. Martin's A Song of Ice and Fire series

The Wicker Man
The Wicker Man (1973 film) is set on the fictional location of Summerisle in Scotland and includes the character Lord Summerisle
The Wicker Man (2006 film) is set on the fictional location of Summersisle in the USA and includes the character Lady Summerisle

See also
 The Somers Isles, an alternative name for Bermuda
Somers Isles Company, which ran Bermuda as a commercial venture in the 17th century
Summerisle, a Scottish indie pop band